WDSR (1340 AM) is a News Talk Information radio station licensed to Lake City, Florida, United States. The station operates under the branding The BIG Talker in simulcast with Live Oak-licensed WQHL (1250 AM). WDSR is owned by Newman Media, Inc. as part of a duopoly with classic hits station WNFB (94.3 FM). Both stations are operated by Southern Stone Communications under a local marketing agreement, making it a sister station to WQHL, Live Oak-licensed country music station WQHL-FM (98.1 FM), Live Oak-licensed sports radio station WJZS (106.1 FM), and Five Points-licensed hot adult contemporary station WCJX (106.5 FM).

History

WDSR, along with sister station WNFB, was purchased by Paul Newman in 1998. The owner passed away in 2015; however, the station remains under ownership by his family via a trust.

In 2013, WDSR flipped from an oldies format to country music under the branding 99.5 The Falcon. Concurrently, WDSR's FM translator switched frequencies from 97.1 FM (W246BY) to 95.5 (W238BW) .

In 2017, operation of WDSR and WNFB moved to Southern Communications (now Southern Stone) under a local marketing agreement. Since then, WDSR flipped to a News Talk Information format in conjunction with Southern Stone-owned WQHL of nearby Live Oak.

Programming
WDSR/WQHL currently feature syndicated programming from Premiere Networks, including The Clay Travis and Buck Sexton Show and The Sean Hannity Show. The station also airs news programming from Fox News Radio.

Translator
WDSR operates a FM translator in the local Lake City area:

References

External links

DSR
News and talk radio stations in the United States
1946 establishments in Florida
Radio stations established in 1946